Pavement Butterfly is a 1929 British-German silent drama film directed by Richard Eichberg and starring Anna May Wong, Alexander Granach, and Gaston Jacquet. It was part of an ongoing co-production arrangement between Eichberg and British International Pictures.

The film was shot at the Babelsberg Studios in Berlin and on location in Paris, Nice and Monte Carlo. The sets were designed by the art directors Willi Herrmann and Werner Schlichting.

Synopsis
A Chinese dancer in the nightclubs of Paris, becomes involved with a Russian painter and becomes his model. She is persecuted by a man named Coco, accused of theft. Later, in the French Riviera she is at last able to prove her innocence.

Cast

References

Bibliography

External links 
 

1929 films
Films of the Weimar Republic
Films directed by Richard Eichberg
British silent feature films
German silent feature films
German black-and-white films
British black-and-white films
German drama films
1929 drama films
British drama films
Films shot at Babelsberg Studios
Films shot in Paris
Films shot in Monaco
Films set in Monaco
Films set in Nice
Films set in Paris
1920s British films
Silent drama films
1920s German films